The Fukien Secondary School is a Direct Subsidy Scheme co-educational school in Ngau Tau Kok, Kowloon, Hong Kong. It is sponsored by the Fukien Chamber of Commerce and was founded in 1951.

History
The school was founded by the Fukien Chamber of Commerce in 1951 in an apartment building in Western. It moved to a new campus on Java Road in North Point in 1966, and then to Kwun Tong in September 2000.

Amid criticism of falling English standards among Hong Kong students in the late 1990s, the Education Department invited ten Chinese medium schools to teach a maximum of three subjects in English. Under this scheme the school began in 2000 to offer an English stream, teaching certain history, math, and science courses using English. Starting from 2013-2014, all junior secondary classes (S1-S3) have adopted English as the medium of instruction. The school has a policy of "bi-literacy and tri-lingualism".

The school, along with its sister schools managed by the same sponsor, was criticised in 2002 for asking students and parents to attend a pro-Beijing demonstration at Victoria Park in support of the controversial Article 23 national security law. The head of the Professional Teachers' Union condemned the "use of students for political purposes". The proposed legislation was eventually withdrawn by the government in 2003 after a massive public backlash.

In 2009, the school took over the sponsorship of "Pegasus Philip Wong Kin Hang Christian Primary cum Junior Secondary School" in Yau Tong and renamed it the "Fukien Secondary School Affiliated School". The school's former operator, the Pegasus Social Service Christian Organisation, had abruptly pulled its sponsorship in May 2009. Fukien bought 60 new computers and refurbished the libraries, gymnasium, and table tennis room. The former Pegasus students also had to sing the Chinese national anthem at assembly for the first time.

Sister schools

References

External links

 

Secondary schools in Hong Kong
Communist schools in Hong Kong
Kwun Tong